Sir Anthony Charles Esmonde, 15th Baronet (18 January 1899 – 17 March 1981) was an Irish Fine Gael politician, medical doctor and farmer.

Early and personal life
He was born on 18 January 1899, at Ashlett House, Church Stretton, Shropshire, the youngest son among the three sons and three daughters of John Joseph Esmonde and his first wife, Rose (née Magennis). He was educated in Germany, at Clongowes Wood College, and at the Royal College of Surgeons in Ireland. After qualifying in 1921 he served as surgeon-lieutenant in the Royal Navy from 1921 to 1925. Thereafter he practised medicine successively in Nenagh, County Tipperary, and Gorey, County Wexford.

Politics
Esmomde first stood for Dáil Éireann as a Fine Gael candidate for the Tipperary constituency at the 1943 general election, but was unsuccessful. He did not stand again until the 1951 general election, when he was returned to the 14th Dáil for the Wexford constituency. His brother Sir John Lymbrick Esmonde was previously a TD for Wexford and retired in 1951. He was re-elected at five successive elections until he retired from the Dáil at the 1973 general election.

He served as a member of the first Irish delegation as Members of the European Parliament from January to March 1973.

Family
His eldest brother was Sir John Esmonde, 14th Baronet, and his second elder brother, Lieutenant Geoffrey Esmonde (1897–1916), was killed in action in World War I serving with the 4th Tyneside Irish of the Northumberland Fusiliers. His half-brother Eugene Esmonde was awarded a Victoria Cross posthumously in 1942 during World War II. His son Sir John Esmonde, 16th Baronet was a Fine Gael TD for Wexford from 1973 to 1977.

He married his second cousin Eithne Moira Grattan Esmonde in 1927, the youngest child of Sir Thomas Esmonde, 11th Baronet; they had three sons and three daughters. He died 17 March 1981 in a Wexford nursing home after a short illness.

See also
Esmonde baronets
Families in the Oireachtas

References

External links

1899 births
1981 deaths
Baronets in the Baronetage of Ireland
Irish diplomats
Irish farmers
Fine Gael TDs
Members of the 14th Dáil
Members of the 15th Dáil
Members of the 16th Dáil
Members of the 17th Dáil
Members of the 18th Dáil
Politicians from County Wexford
Members of the 19th Dáil
Anthony
Fine Gael MEPs
MEPs for the Republic of Ireland 1973
People educated at Clongowes Wood College
Alumni of the Royal College of Surgeons in Ireland